The 39th Division was an infantry division of the British Army, raised during the First World War. The division was part of Kitchener's New Armies and saw service on the Western Front and in Italy from 1916 onwards.

History
The division was formed as part of the fifth wave (K5) of divisions in the New Army; it did not have a regional title, but was composed primarily of recruits from the Midlands, London, and the south of England. Several of its battalions had been raised by local communities, and were named for their towns or industries. After training and home service, it deployed to the Western Front in early 1916, and fought in the Battle of the Somme. The following year, it saw action at the Third Battle of Ypres, and in 1918 took heavy losses in the German Army's Spring Offensive. The General Officer Commanding, Major-General Edward Feetham, was killed in the action in March 1918.

Following near-destruction at the Battle of the Lys, the division was reduced to a cadre, which spent the remainder of the war training newly arrived units of the American Expeditionary Forces (AEF). The division demobilised after the Armistice with Germany, and had ceased to exist by July 1919.

Order of battle
The following units served with the division:

116th Brigade

The brigade was originally numbered the 121st intended for the 40th Division of the Fifth New Army. The brigades first commander was Brigadier-General Reginald Barnes.
 11th (Service) Battalion (1st South Down), Royal Sussex Regiment (left June 1918)
 12th (Service) Battalion (2nd South Down), Royal Sussex Regiment (disbanded 8 February 1918)
 13th (Service) Battalion (3rd South Down), Royal Sussex Regiment (left June 1918)
 14th (Service) Battalion (1st Portsmouth), Hampshire Regiment (disbanded 23 February 1918)
 1/1st Battalion, Herefordshire Regiment (Territorial Force)  (joined 8 February 1918, left 9 May 1918)
 1/4th Battalion, East Yorkshire Regiment (TF) (joined as a cadre 15 July 1918, demobilised 7 November 1918)
 116th Machine Gun Company (formed 18 May 1916, moved to 39th Battalion, Machine Gun Corps (M.G.C.) 14 March 1918)
 116th Trench Mortar Battery (formed 16 June 1916)

117th Brigade
 16th (Service) Battalion (Chatsworth Rifles), Sherwood Foresters (Nottinghamshire and Derbyshire Regiment) (left 16 August 1918)
 17th (Service) Battalion (Welbeck Rangers), Sherwood Foresters (Nottinghamshire and Derbyshire Regiment) (disbanded 8 February 1918)
 17th (Service) Battalion (British Empire League), King's Royal Rifle Corps (left 16 August 1918)
 16th (Service) Battalion (St. Pancras), Rifle Brigade (Prince Consort's Own) (left August 1918)
 117th Machine Gun Company (formed 18 May 1916, moved to 39th Battalion, M.G.C. 14 March 1918)
 117th Trench Mortar Battery (formed 18 June 1916)

118th Brigade
 10th (Service) Battalion (Kent County), Queen's Own (Royal West Kent Regiment) (left 16 October 1915)
 11th (Service) Battalion (Lewisham), Queen's Own (Royal West Kent Regiment) (left 16 October 1915)
 13th (Service) Battalion (Wandsworth), East Surrey Regiment (remained in England 23 February 1916)
 20th (Service) Battalion (Shoreditch), Duke of Cambridge's Own (Middlesex Regiment) (remained in England 23 February 1916)
 21st (Service) Battalion (Islington), Duke of Cambridge's Own (Middlesex Regiment) (remained in England 23 February 1916)
 14th (Service) Battalion, Princess Louise's (Argyll and Sutherland Highlanders) (remained in England 23 February 1916)
 1/6th (T.F.) Battalion, Cheshire Regiment (joined 29 February 1916, left 28 May 1918)
 1/4th (T.F.) Battalion, Black Watch (Royal Highlanders) (joined 29 February 1916, merged with 1/5th Battalion March 1916, became 4th/5th Battalion)
 1/5th (T.F.) Battalion, Black Watch (Royal Highlanders) (joined 29 February 1916, merged with 1/4th Battalion March 1916, became 4th/5th Battalion)
 1/1st (T.F.) Battalion, Cambridgeshire Regiment (joined 29 February 1916, left 9 May 1918)
 1/1st (T.F.) Battalion, Hertfordshire Regiment (joined 29 February 1916, left 8 April 1918)
 118th Machine Gun Company, (formed 21 March 1916, moved to 39th Battalion, M.G.C. 14 March 1918)
 118th Trench Mortar Battery (formed 1 July 1916)

39th Divisional Composite Brigade

Formed on 10 April 1918 after the Division suffered heavy losses and placed under command of Brig-Gen. A. Hubback. Fought in the Battles of the Lys as an independent command attached to XXII Corps. Returned to Division and men deployed to old units by 6 May 1918.
1st Battalion (formed from remnants of 11th Royal Sussex and 1/1st Hertfordshire)
2nd Battalion (formed from remnants of 13th Gloucestershire and 13th Royal Sussex)
3rd Battalion (formed from remnants of units of 117th Brigade)
4th Battalion (formed from remnants of units 118th Brigade)
5th Battalion (formed from remnants of units of all three Brigades)
118th Trench Mortar Battery
No 4 (287th) Company, 39th Divisional Train Army Service Corps (A.S.C.)	

Divisional Troops
13th (Service) Battalion, (Forest of Dean) Gloucestershire Regiment (divisional pioneers, left as a cadre by 6 May 1918)
228th Machine Gun Company (joined 19 July 1917, moved to 39th Battalion M.G.C. 14 March 1918, left 11 September 1918)
39th Battalion M.G.C. (formed 14 March 1918, absorbing the brigade MG companies)
Divisional Mounted Troops
E Squadron, South Irish Horse (joined 17 March 1916, left 10 May 1916)
39th Divisional Cyclist Company, Army Cyclist Corps (joined 14 November 1915, left  10 May 1916)
39th Divisional Train A.S.C.
284th, 285th, 286th and 287th Companies
50th Mobile Veterinary Section Army Veterinary Corps
236th Divisional Employment Company (joined 30 June 1917)

For short periods in the summer of 1918, 47 battalion cadres from reorganised divisions that had suffered heavy losses in the German spring offensives were attached to the brigades and division HQ.

39th (Deptford) Divisional Artillery
The whole divisional artillery was raised by the Mayor and Corporation of Deptford; operated as an independent formation after April 1918
CLXXIV (Deptford) Brigade, Royal Field Artillery (RFA)	
CLXXIX (Deptford) Brigade, RFA (broken up 18 January 1917)
CLXXXIV (Deptford) Brigade, RFA (broken up 30 November 1916)
CLXXXVI (Deptford) Howitzer Brigade, RFA
39th (Deptford) Divisional Ammunition Column, RFA
39th Divisional Trench Mortar Brigade
V.39 Heavy Trench Mortar Battery, RFA (formed 27 August 1916; broken up 7 February 1918)
X.39, Y.39 and Z.39 Medium Mortar Batteries, R.F.A. (formed 21 March 1916; Z broken up redistributed to X and Y batteries 7 February 1918; X and Y disbanded 15 May 1918)

Royal Engineers
225th (Stockton on Tees) Field Company
227th (Stockton on Tees) Field Company
234th (Stockton on Tees) Company
39th Divisional Signals Company (Empire)

Royal Army Medical Corps
132nd Field Ambulance	
133rd Field Ambulance	
134th Field Ambulance	
82nd Sanitary Section (left 17 April 1917)

See also

 List of British divisions in World War I

References

Infantry divisions of the British Army in World War I
Kitchener's Army divisions
Military units and formations established in 1915
Military units and formations disestablished in 1919
1915 establishments in the United Kingdom